The 2011 Miami Dolphins season was the franchise's 42nd season in the National Football League, the 46th overall and the fourth and final under head coach Tony Sparano. The Dolphins made their first round selection with the 15th pick of the 2011 NFL Draft on Florida offensive lineman Mike Pouncey. The team got off to an 0–7 start but won six of their final nine games, however, this result failed to improve on their record from 2010 and Sparano was fired on December 12.

Offseason

2011 NFL draft

DraftKing.com, NFLMocks.com, and The Palm Beach Post predicted that the Dolphins would use their first round pick to choose Gabe Carimi, a left tackle for the Wisconsin Badgers who won the 2010 Outland Trophy as the nation's top collegiate interior lineman, and was a Consensus All-American.  Charles Davis of NFL.com predicted they would draft Mark Ingram II from the University of Alabama.

Personnel changes
Brian Daboll joins the team as offensive coordinator. Karl Dorrell moves to quarter backs coach from wide receivers coach. Jeff Nixon added as the running backs coach. Steve Bush moves to wide receivers coach from offensive quality control. Ike Hilliard added as an assistant wide receivers coach. Dan Campbell moves to tight ends coach from intern. Bryan Cox is added as a defensive pass rush coach.

Roster changes

Re-signings
March 4 — Re-signed guard Richie Incognito three years 
July 30 — Re-signed defensive end Tony McDaniel two years 
August 5	— Re-signed offensive tackle Nate Garner, running back Lex Hilliard, offensive tackle Lydon Murtha, running back Kory Sheets

Signings
July 26 — Signed quarterback Pat Devlin
July 29 — Signed linebacker Kevin Burnett
July 30 — Signed linebacker Jason Trusnik, quarter back Matt Moore
July 31 — Signed defensive end Ronald Fields
August 1 — Signed offensive tackle Marc Colombo
August 2 — Signed linebacker Jason Taylor
August 5	— Signed quarter back Kevin O'Connell
August 6	— Signed offensive tackle Ray Willis
August 9	— Signed linebacker David Nixon, cornerback K.J. Gerard
August 15 — Signed wide receiver John Matthews, linebacker Marvin Mitchell
August 22 — Signed guard Tyler Donohue
August 23 — Signed running back Larry Johnson
August 29 — Signed safety Gerald Alexander
September 4 — Signed tight end Will Yeatman
September 5 — Signed tight end Dante Rosario and center/guard Ryan Cook
September 8 — Signed running back Larry Johnson
September 14 — Signed cornerback Will Allen
September 20 — Signed defensive end Igor Olshansky and cornerback Nate Jones
September 28 — Signed running back Steve Slaton
October 6 — Signed quarterback Sage Rosenfels

Departures
July 29 — UFA quarter back Tyler Thigpen, UFA quarter back Chad Pennington
August 2 — UFA running back Ronnie Brown, Released linebacker Channing Crowder
August 3	— Terminated the contract of linebacker Tim Dobbins
August 8 — UFA running back Ricky Williams
August 15 — Waived wide receiver Brooks Foster
August 23 — Waived running back Kory Sheets
August 26 — Waived corner back K.J. Gerard, defensive tackle Johnny Jones, corner back Jose Perez 
August 27 — Waived/Injured linebacker Mike Rivera
August 30 — Waived tackle Tyler Donahue
September 2 — Waived tight end Dedrick Epps and wide receiver John Matthews. Terminated contract of safety Gerald Alexander.
September 3 — Waived quarterback Kevin O'Connell, safety Mark Restelli, cornerback Vincent Agnew, tight end Brett Brackett, wide receiver Patrick Carter, guard Garrett Chisolm, quarterback Pat Devlin, linebacker Jonathan Freeny, running back Nic Grigsby, tackle D.J. Jones, tackle Matt Kopa, wide receiver Phillip Livas, cornerback Nate Ness, linebacker David Nixon, wide receiver Julius Pruitt, linebacker Robert Rose, tight end Mickey Shuler, and linebacker Quinton Spears. Terminated contracts with corner back Will Allen, nose tackle Ronald Fields, running back Larry Johnson, full back Lousaka Polite, and tackle Ray Willis.
September 4 — Waived defensive tackle Frank Kearse
September 5 — Released linebacker A.J. Edds and terminated the contract of center Joe Berger
September 8 — Waived guard Ray Feinga
September 13 — Terminated the contract of corner back Benny Sapp
September 20 — Terminated the contracts of running back Larry Johnson and tight end Dante Rosario.
September 28 — Cut defensive end Ryan Baker

Trades
July 29 — Traded reserve safety Jonathon Amaya and an exchange of undisclosed draft picks for running back Reggie Bush.

Team Captains
The team voted the following as their 2011 team captains.

Offense
Chad Henne
Jake Long

Defense
Yeremiah Bell
Karlos Dansby

Special Teams

Head coach Tony Sparano decided that the special teams captain would be selected on week to week basis.

Staff

Final roster

Schedule

Preseason

Regular season

Game summaries

Week 1: vs. New England Patriots

The Dolphins began their 2011 campaign at home, for a Week 1 AFC East duel with the New England Patriots in the first game of Monday Night Football's doubleheader.  Miami delivered the game's opening splash with a 9-yard touchdown run from quarterback Chad Henne.  The Patriots answered with running back BenJarvus Green-Ellis getting a 4-yard touchdown run.  New England took the lead in the second quarter as quarterback Tom Brady completed a 10-yard touchdown pass to tight end Rob Gronkowski.

The Dolphins struck back in the third quarter as Henne found wide receiver Brian Hartline on a 10-yard touchdown pass, but New England came right back with Brady completing a 2-yard touchdown pass to wide receiver Wes Welker.  Miami replied with a 20-yard field goal from kicker Dan Carpenter, but the Patriots came right back with Brady completing a 1-yard touchdown pass to tight end Aaron Hernandez.  New England added onto their in the fourth quarter as kicker Stephen Gostkowski got a 20-yard field goal, followed by Brady completing a 99-yard touchdown pass to Welker.  The Dolphins would close out the game with Henne finding running back Reggie Bush on a 2-yard touchdown pass.

With the loss, Miami began their season at 0–1.

Week 2: vs. Houston Texans

With the loss, the Dolphins dropped to 0–2.

Week 3: at Cleveland Browns

With the loss, the Dolphins fell to 0–3.

Week 4: at San Diego Chargers

With the loss, the Dolphins went into their bye week 0–4.

Week 6: at New York Jets

With the loss, the Dolphins fell to 0–5.

Week 7: vs. Denver Broncos

With the loss, the Dolphins fell to 0–6.

Week 8: at New York Giants

With the loss, the Dolphins fell to 0–7.

Week 9: at Kansas City Chiefs

With the win, the Dolphins improved to 1–7 and made the Colts the only winless team.

Week 10: vs. Washington Redskins

With the win, the Dolphins improved to 2–7.

Week 11: vs. Buffalo Bills

Coming off their win over the Redskins, the Dolphins stayed at home for a Week 11 AFC East showdown with the Buffalo Bills.  Miami trailed early in the first quarter as Bills kicker Dave Rayner made a 30-yard field goal, yet the Dolphins immediately answered with quarterback Matt Moore finding tight end Anthony Fasano on a 1-yard touchdown pass, followed by a 5-yard touchdown run from running back Reggie Bush.  Miami would add onto their lead in the second quarter with Moore connecting with fullback Charles Clay on a 12-yard touchdown pass, followed by wide receiver Davone Bess on a 4-yard touchdown pass.  Buffalo would close out the half with Rayner booting a 56-yard field goal.

The Dolphins continued their dominating day in the third quarter with running back Lex Hilliard recovering a blocked punt in the endzone for a touchdown (the team's first TD off of a blocked punt since 1990).  The Bills tried to rally as linebacker Kelvin Sheppard tackled rookie running back Daniel Thomas in the endzone for a safety, but Miami's lead proved to be too much to overcome.

With the win, the Dolphins improved to 3–7.

This game also marked the first time since 1990 that Miami allowed 10 points or fewer in three straight games. They became the third team in NFL history to win 3 straight after starting the season at least 0–7 (1978 Cardinals and 1986 Colts).

Week 12: at Dallas Cowboys
Thanksgiving Day game

Coming off their win over the Bills, the Dolphins flew to Cowboys Stadium for a Week 12 interconference duel with the Dallas Cowboys on Thanksgiving.  Miami delivered the game's opening punch in the first quarter with a 26-yard field goal from kicker Shayne Graham, but the Cowboys answered in the second quarter with kicker Dan Bailey getting a 32-yard field goal, followed by quarterback Tony Romo completing a 5-yard touchdown pass to wide receiver Laurent Robinson.  The Dolphins would close out the half with a 28-yard field goal from Graham.

Miami would regain the lead in the third quarter with a 27-yard field goal from Graham, followed by quarterback Matt Moore finding wide receiver Brandon Marshall on a 35-yard field goal.  Dallas struck back in the fourth quarter with Romo completing an 18-yard touchdown pass to Robinson.  The Dolphins would reply with a 23-yard field goal from Graham, but the Cowboys got the last laugh with Bailey nailing the game-winning 28-yard field goal.

With the loss, Miami fell to 3–8.

Week 13: vs. Oakland Raiders

With the win, the Dolphins improved to 4–8.

Week 14: vs. Philadelphia Eagles

With the loss, the Dolphins dropped to 4–9, and were officially eliminated from postseason contention. One day later (December 12), head coach Tony Sparano was fired and replaced by assistant coach Todd Bowles on an interim basis for the remainder of the season.

Week 15: at Buffalo Bills

Week 16: at New England Patriots

Week 17: vs. New York Jets

The Dolphins closed out their season with a 19–17 win over the Jets that knocked the Jets out of playoff contention.  The Dolphins intercepted Mark Sanchez three times and limited him to 235 passing yards.   The win was the 400th in Miami Dolphins franchise history and the final game for Jason Taylor, held to one tackle in the game; he recovered what was initially ruled a fumble by the Jets and raced to a touchdown, but the score was nullified when the ball was ruled down by contact.

Standings

References

Miami
Miami Dolphins seasons
Miami Dolphins